Kampioenschap van Vlaanderen (Championship of Flanders) or Koolskamp Koerse is a single-day road bicycle race held annually in September in Koolskamp (part-municipality of Ardooie), West Flanders, Belgium. Since 2005, the race is organized as a 1.1 event on the UCI Europe Tour.

Winners

Footnotes

References

External links
 

UCI Europe Tour races
Recurring sporting events established in 1908
1908 establishments in Belgium
Cycle races in Belgium